TIH may refer to:

 Their Imperial Highnesses, as a style
 Tin Hau station, Hong Kong, MTR station code
 Timugon Murut language of Malaysia, ISO 639-3 code

See also
 Tih, a river in Romania